Platamonina is a genus of moths of the family Crambidae.

Species
Platamonina ampliatalis (Lederer, 1863)
Platamonina poecilura (E. Hering, 1903)
Platamonina ptochura (Meyrick, 1894)

References

Spilomelinae
Crambidae genera
Taxa named by Eugene G. Munroe